A justice and public safety practitioner is an American public service job role.

The practitioner is a local, state, tribal or federal government employee who devotes their time to the practice of providing, administering or promoting justice and public safety services according to the laws, policies and practices of the government entity they serve.  They are mindful of national standards and codes of conduct and often are members of state or national organizations that seek to improve the efficiency, effectiveness and quality of their profession.

Practitioners historically are employed by agencies such as law enforcement, prosecutors/district attorneys, the courts, jail and correctional institutions, supervised custody organizations and the technology organizations that support these agencies.

See also
 Department of Public Safety

References

Cultural Skills for the Restorative Justice Practitioner The Office for Victims of Crime a component of the Office of Justice Programs, U.S. Department of Justice

Legal professions
Public administration
Safety